Tsesis may refer to:

 Alexander Tsesis, American constitutional scholar
 Cēsis, town in Latvia